Abad-e Eram Posht (also Romanized as Abād-e Eram Posht; also known as Eram Dasht, Eram Posht, Ḩaram Posht, and Qal‘ehābād) is a village in Baraan-e Shomali Rural District, in the Central District of Isfahan County, Isfahan Province, Iran. At the 2006 census, its population was 296, in 62 families.

References 

Populated places in Isfahan County